A constitutional referendum was held in the Comoros on 5 November 1989. The proposed amendments to the constitution would allow incumbent President Ahmed Abdallah to run for a third term, as well as creating the post of Prime Minister. 

The official result was a 92.5 percent majority in favor of the amendments proposed by Abdallah. This created "the conditions for a life presidency," warned one opposition leader. Voting was marked by manipulation by the government. Opposition groups reported that polling places lacked private voting booths, government officials blocked the entry of opposition poll watchers, and the army and police removed ballot boxes before voting ended. Reaction to these abuses was unusually angry. In Njazidja voters smashed ballot boxes rather than have them carted away by the army; the governor's office in Nzwani was set on fire, and a bomb was found outside the home of the minister of finance in Moroni. More than 100 people were arrested following the referendum, and in subsequent weeks the international media described a deteriorating situation in the islands; Abdallah claimed that France "authorizes terrorism in the Comoros," and leaders of the banned opposition questioned the legitimacy of the referendum in public statements.

On 26 November Abdallah was killed during a coup led by Said Mohamed Djohar.

Results

References

Comoros
Referendums in the Comoros
Constitutional
Constitutional referendums in the Comoros
Election and referendum articles with incomplete results